Suzhou, Jiangsu (江苏苏州), is a prefecture-level city of Jiangsu Province, China.

Suzhou may also refer to:
Suzhou, Anhui (安徽宿州), a prefecture-level city of Anhui Province.
Suzhou District (肃州区), a district of Jiuquan City, Gansu Province.
Suzhou Creek (苏州河), a tributary of Huangpu River passing through Shanghai, with its principal outlet in Suzhou, Jiangsu

Other uses
Suzhou River (film), a film by Lou Ye
2719 Suzhou, an asteroid named after Suzhou, Jiangsu
Suzhou dialect
Suzhou embroidery
Suzhou numerals

See also
Xuzhou (disambiguation)
Suchow (disambiguation)